The men's javelin F55/56 event at the 2008 Summer Paralympics took place at the Beijing National Stadium at 17:55 on 9 September. There was a single round of competition, and as there were only 6 entrants they took 6 throws each.
The competition was won by Pieter Gruijters, representing .

Results

 
WR = World Record. SB = Seasonal Best.

References

Athletics at the 2008 Summer Paralympics